Epidendrum geminiflorum is a tropical epiphytic orchid native to Colombia, Ecuador, Peru, Suriname, and Venezuela at elevations of 2.3—2.9 km.

Description 
Epidendrum geminiflorum displays a sympodial habit, producing upright, slightly flexible stems ~1.5 dm tall, covered by tubular sheathes and ending in three to four oblong, obtuse to retuse, leathery leaves and a terminal spathe, through which the inflorescence erupts.  The fleshy yellow-green to brown-green flowers have oblong-lanceolate sepals ~1.8 cm long and slightly shorter linear-lanceolate petals. The sepals curl backwards along their margins.  The obscurely trilobate lip is adnate to the column to its apex, and cordate at the base. The medial lobe is acute.

References

External links 
Pictures of the plant can be found at
 The Internet Orchid Species Photo Encyclopedia
 http://maqui.ucdavis.edu/Images/Orchids/epidendrum_geminiflorum.html

geminiflorum
Orchids of Colombia
Orchids of Ecuador
Orchids of Peru
Orchids of Suriname
Orchids of Venezuela